is a plastic surgeon based in Tokyo. He has attracted controversies regarding his stances of Holocaust and Nanking Massacre denial.

Takasu is a member of Japan Medical Association, Japan Society of Aesthetic Surgery, Japanese Association of Cosmetic Surgeons, Japan Society of Plastic and Reconstructive Surgery, and is a former member of the American Academy of Cosmetic Surgery. In January 2011, Takasu was also appointed to be a visiting professor of cosmetic surgery at Showa University School of Medicine.

Life
Takasu studied at Showa University School of Medicine in Tokyo. As a graduate student, Takasu went to Germany and Italy, where he studied plastic and cosmetic surgery. In 1974, he established the Takasu General Hospital in his hometown, and in 1976, Takasu Clinic in Nagoya. As of 2010, Takasu Clinic has its branches in Tokyo, Yokohama, and Osaka. In 1987, Takasu performed liposuction in Japan for the first time, having learned the technique from Pierre Fournier in Paris, France. Takasu has been President of Japan Society of Liposuction Surgery since 1987.

Rejuvenation project
In 1999, at the age of 54, Takasu started to feel it strange that cosmetic surgeons looked older than their patients. He also thought it odd that surgeons actually did not know how painful each procedure was. Takasu made a resolution to experience a series of cosmetic surgeries himself and rejuvenate by 20 years. Within a year, Takasu underwent facelift, buccal fat removal, phenol peel, upper and lower blepharoplasty, hair transplantation, liposuction, and golden thread implant. As of 2010, at the age of 65, his rejuvenation project is still in progress. Takasu later referred to the resolution as life changing, because it brought him back to the starting point of a medical doctor, "share the pains with patients."

Philanthropy
Takasu is also a philanthropist. Immediately after the 1995 Great Hanshin earthquake, which killed 6,434 people and injured 43,792, Takasu established Organization of Cosmetic Surgery Volunteers in cooperation with surgeons from 9 other clinics. The organization offered plastic and reconstructive treatment to the earthquake victims for free.

Guinness World Record
On August 2, 2011, Dr. Takasu together with his friend Koji Ishida (aged 71) established a Guinness World Record of most golf holes played by a pair in 12 hours (cart). The pair completed 261 holes at Kyowa Country Club, Toyota City, Aichi Prefecture, Japan.

Controversies 
In 2017, the Simon Wiesenthal Center was made aware of Tweets made by the doctor in 2015, wherein he praised Nazism for the progress made in German technology under the Nazi regime. He stated that no doubt that the Jews were persecuted by the National Socialist German Workers' Party, but the toll of Auschwitz and the Holocaust victims was exaggerated by Allies. The Simon Wiesenthal Center announced that the American Academy of Cosmetic Surgery had responded to the center that an investigation about his membership would be completed in a few weeks.

On November 8, 2017, the Simon Wiesenthal Center announced that the American Academy of Cosmetic Surgery expelled him due to the Holocaust and Nanjing Massacre denial.

Takasu has also posted articles denying sexual slavery by the Japanese imperial military during World War II and defending Unit 731.

Forgery controversy
In 2020, Takasu initiated a formal petition to recall the governor of Aichi prefecture, Hideaki Ōmura because of an art exhibition held in Aichi which Takasu considered degenerate. In February 2021 it was found that 83% of the signatures on the petition were fraudulent, many of them being written by the same person in the same handwriting. On May 19, four of Takasu's collaborators were arrested, while Ōmura called on Takasu to take personal responsibility.

References

People from Aichi Prefecture
Japanese plastic surgeons
Japanese racehorse owners and breeders
Japanese nationalists
Nanjing Massacre deniers
Living people
1945 births
Jōdo Shinshū Buddhist priests
Historical negationism